Kaskel is a surname of German origin. Notable people with the surname include:

Alfred Kaskel (1901–1968), American real estate developer and hotelier
Walter Kaskel (1882-1928), German jurist

References

Surnames of German origin